Skag is an American television series starring Karl Malden.

Skag may also refer to:
 Skeg, also spelled , the stern ward extension of the keel of some boats and ships
 Hacaritama Airport, by ICAO code

See also
Skaggs (disambiguation)